Corallorhiza, the coralroot, is a genus of flowering plants in the orchid family. Except for the circumboreal C. trifida, the genus is restricted to North America (including Mexico, Central America and the West Indies).

Most species are putatively parasitic, relying entirely upon mycorrhizal fungi within their coral-shaped rhizomes for sustenance. Because of this dependence on myco-heterotrophy, they have never been successfully cultivated. Most species are leafless and rootless. Most species produce little or no chlorophyll, and do not utilize photosynthesis. An exception is the yellowish green species Corallorhiza trifida, which has some chlorophyll and is able to fix CO2. However, this species also depends primarily on fungal associations for carbon acquisition.

List of species
Many species names have been proposed that are now considered synonyms of other species, or members of other genera. Species accepted as members of Corallorhiza as of :

See also 
 Neottia
 Pterospora

References

External links 
 
 

 
Myco-heterotrophic orchids
Calypsoinae genera